Oleg Yuryevich Pichugin (born 14 March 1974) is a Russian football coach and a former player. He is the manager of the Under-19 squad of FC Ural Yekaterinburg.

Club career
He played 5 seasons in the Russian Football National League for FC Uralets Nizhny Tagil and FC Ural Yekaterinburg.

References

1974 births
People from Nizhny Tagil
Living people
Soviet footballers
Russian footballers
Association football midfielders
FC Uralets Nizhny Tagil players
FC Ural Yekaterinburg players
FC Neftekhimik Nizhnekamsk players
FC Torpedo Miass players
Russian football managers
Sportspeople from Sverdlovsk Oblast